The 1933 Brooklyn Dodgers finished in 6th place. After the season, manager Max Carey was fired and replaced by coach Casey Stengel.

Offseason 
 December 15, 1932: Cy Moore, Neal Finn and Jack Warner were traded by the Dodgers to the Philadelphia Phillies for Ray Benge and cash.
 January 7, 1933: Ike Boone was purchased from the Dodgers by the Detroit Tigers.
 February 8, 1933: Dazzy Vance and Gordon Slade were traded by the Dodgers to the St. Louis Cardinals for Jake Flowers and Ownie Carroll.

Regular season

Season standings

Record vs. opponents

Notable transactions 
 May 14, 1933: Max Rosenfeld was purchased from the Dodgers by the Washington Senators.
 June 16, 1933: Lefty O'Doul and Watty Clark were traded by the Dodgers to the New York Giants for Sam Leslie.

Roster

Player stats

Batting

Starters by position 
Note: Pos = Position; G = Games played; AB = At bats; H = Hits; Avg. = Batting average; HR = Home runs; RBI = Runs batted in

Other batters 
Note: G = Games played; AB = At bats; H = Hits; Avg. = Batting average; HR = Home runs; RBI = Runs batted in

Pitching

Starting pitchers 
Note: G = Games pitched; IP = Innings pitched; W = Wins; L = Losses; ERA = Earned run average; SO = Strikeouts

Other pitchers 
Note: G = Games pitched; IP = Innings pitched; W = Wins; L = Losses; ERA = Earned run average; SO = Strikeouts

Relief pitchers 
Note: G = Games pitched; W = Wins; L = Losses; SV = Saves; ERA = Earned run average; SO = Strikeouts

Awards and honors 
1933 Major League Baseball All-Star Game
Tony Cuccinello reserve

Farm system

Notes

References 
Baseball-Reference season page
Baseball Almanac season page
Retrosheet

External links 
1933 Brooklyn Dodgers uniform
Brooklyn Dodgers reference site
Acme Dodgers page 

Los Angeles Dodgers seasons
Brooklyn Dodgers season
Brooklyn
1930s in Brooklyn
Flatbush, Brooklyn